Commonword (1975–present) is a writing development organisation based in Manchester, North West England, providing opportunities for new and aspiring writers to develop their talent and potential, promoting new writing on national and international levels. The organisation was set up in 1975. It is currently the largest new writing, community writing and publishing organisation in the North West.  It is a limited company and registered charity, and is Arts Council funded. Activist and writer Deyika Nzeribe was a former chair.

History 
Commonword was set up as writing workshop and community publisher of working-class writing in Manchester. Greg Wilkinson was one of the organisation's founder members.

Cultureword

Cultureword is the strand of Commonword established in 1986 as a centre for black and Asian creative writing. Lemn Sissay was working at the organisation as Cultureword's literature worker and convenor of the "Tight Fisted Poets" group, nurturing new writing talent among many of Manchester's BAME writers. This objective remains fundamental to the organisation's stance to this day.

Activities 
Commonword runs writers' groups, workshops, events, conferences and competitions to further its aims.

Identity 
Identity, Cultureword's weekly group for black and Asian writers, has been running since the late 1980s.

Young Identity
Young Identity (also known as YI) was created in 2006 by Shirley May and Ali Gadema, and is a spoken-word collective aimed at younger writers, aged 13–25. Young Identity has performed all over the United Kingdom, working with a diverse range of writers including Saul Williams, Linton Kwesi Johnson, Ted Hughes Prize Winner Kae Tempest and the late Amiri Baraka.

Black and Asian Writers Conference 
In association with the Manchester Literature Festival, Commonword holds the biannual Black and Asian Writers Conference, which aims to highlight the lack of diversity within the publishing industry and encompasses a series of talks, workshops and interviews. Among speakers featured in 2016 were Nii Parkes, Sandeep Parmar and JJ Bola, on wide-ranging topics that included "Writing in Translation: What makes for a good translation?", "Young Writers: How does Generation Y's writing differ from Generation X's?" and "Black and Dangerous: BAME representation of mental health in writing", the conference concluding with an event headlined by Lemn Sissay.

Ghosts 
In 2011, Commonword launched Ghosts, a project funded by the National Heritage Lottery Fund to capture the social history of Manchester clubs in Moss Side and Hulme from the 1950 until the 1980s such as The Nile and The Reno.

Publications
Commonword has previously published work by Rosie Garland, Lemn Sissay, Zahid Hussain and Sherry Ashworth.

Crocus Books 
Crocus is the publishing imprint of Commonword and Cultureword. It publishes works of fiction and poetry written by authors from the northwest of England.

Prizes and competitions

Superheroes of Slam 
From the late 2000s Commonword ran Superheroes of Slam, a slam poetry competition for the Diké Omeje Slam Poetry Award. Previous winners include Dominic Berry, Mark Mace Smith, Ben Mellor, Joy France and Paris Kaur.

Commonword Children's Diversity Writing Prize
Commonword launched its annual Children's Diversity Writing Prize in 2011.

References

External links
Commonword website
Manchester Literature Festival

Charities based in Manchester
1975 establishments in England